The SL C30 is a type of subway train used in the Stockholm metro, Sweden. Since 2020, 96 sets were delivered to Stockholm by Bombardier Transportation.

References

External links

Stockholms nya t-banetåg får designpris – här är detaljerna
Ståplats och fler passagerare i nya tunnelbanetågen
Här är nya tunnelbanetåget – premiärtur på röda linjen
Nya tunnelbanevagnar även till blå linje
Röda linjen testkör i Berlin
Nya tunnelbanetåget C30 trafikerar i skarpt läge

Bombardier Transportation multiple units
Multiple units of Sweden
Stockholm metro

750 V DC multiple units